Robert S. Estock is a former American football coach.  He served as the head football coach at the United States Coast Guard Academy in New London, Connecticut for one season, in 1998, compiling a record of 1–8.

Head coaching record

References

Year of birth missing (living people)
Living people
American football ends
Bridgeport Purple Knights football coaches
Coast Guard Bears football coaches
Colorado State Rams football players
Davidson Wildcats football coaches
Yale Bulldogs football coaches
High school football coaches in Connecticut
Junior college football players in the United States
People from Milford, Connecticut
Players of American football from Connecticut